Horse feathers or horsefeathers may refer to:

Arts 
 Horse Feathers, a 1932 pre-Code comedy film starring the Marx Brothers
 Horse Feathers (band), an American indie folk band from Portland, Oregon

Equestrian 
 Deciduous hoof capsule, a covering on the hooves of newborn foals, sometimes called "horse feathers"
 Feathering (horse), long hair on the lower legs of some breeds of horse